Long Vacation (also known as ) is a Japanese television drama series from Fuji Television, first shown in Japan from 15 April to 24 June 1996.

The show's high ratings in Japan made Takuya Kimura popular in the Asia-Pacific region and is known as "The King of Ratings".

The characters in the series have something in common: if not jobless, they can do no better than secure a temporary job. This is a portrayal of a time when Japan was plagued by deep recession, when its people suffered profound depression from constant failure to earn a stable income. The series also portrays how relationships are made and broken, and explores how people come to depend on each other for solace.

Plot
Minami and Sena meet when Sena's apartment-mate, Asakura, jilts Minami on their wedding day. Minami learns from Sena that Asakura has left, whereabouts unknown. Sena allows Minami to move into the apartment, since she is penniless, having given all her money to Asakura, and cannot pay the rent on her apartment.

This is the beginning of a romance between Sena and Minami. Minami and Sena confide in and console each other about their relationship problems and their lack of success in life. Sena has a crush on his junior, Ryoko. However, Ryoko does not feel the same, instead, she falls for Minami's little brother Shinji.

Minami meets a professional photographer, Sugisaki, who proposes marriage. Although Sugisaki fits Minami's ideal, she feels unsure about her feeling. Meanwhile, Sena has a chance of winning a piano competition and going to Boston, joining the symphony orchestra. After he wins the contest, he proposes Minami to marry and go with him to Boston.

Cast

Takuya Kimura as 
Tomoko Yamaguchi as 
Yutaka Takenouchi as 
Takako Matsu as 
Izumi Inamori as 
Ryō as 
Leo Morimoto as 
Ryōko Hirosue as 
Kosuke Toyohara as

Episodes

Production
The theme song was La La La Love Song by Toshinobu Kubota.

Media
Long Vacation was released on DVD in Japan on 21 November 2001. At the time it was released, it had a limited edition booklet released alongside the first 5,000 DVD copies.

Novel
A novelization of Long Vacation was written by Eriko Kitagawa.

Broadcast
It was formerly broadcast in Hong Kong. In the US, it was formerly aired via KTSF TV with English subtitles.

On 22 July, Viu announced that they have acquired the streaming rights to broadcast Long Vacation to Southeast Asia with regional subtitles alongside Love Generation, A Sleeping Forest, The Ordinary People, Hundred Million Stars From The Sky and the Hero series.

Reception
When the series debuted in Japan, it was so popular with the female audience that the expression  was used to highlight its fanbase. This was because the series was broadcast on Monday evenings.  The episodes had an average rating of 29.5% of viewers, with the final episode reaching 36.7%. According to a research study conducted by NHK in 2009, the bulk of viewers were those who were teenagers (13 or older), at 40% of viewers, the second group were from those in their twenties at 34%.

The series was popular with viewers in Hong Kong thanks to pirated VCD copies sold there before the show was legally broadcast.

On 11 November 2019, Fuji TV announced that photos and props from the show were on display at Fuji TV's Headquarters in Odaiba to highlight the most popular dramas viewed through the Heisei Era in an exhibit until January 2020.

According to Television, Japan and Globalization, the themes of finding happiness are embodied through Minami when she mentions of her right to seek happiness by herself instead of getting married. This view is centered on people's lives when they look for existential meaning.

References

Bibliography

External links
 Official Fuji TV website
 

1996 Japanese television series debuts
1996 Japanese television series endings
Japanese drama television series
Television series about vacationing
Works about pianos and pianists
Fuji TV dramas